Gahnia microstachya is a tussock-forming perennial in the family Cyperaceae, that is native to south eastern parts of Australia  from New South Wales to Tasmania.

References

microstachya
Plants described in 1878
Flora of Tasmania
Flora of Victoria (Australia)
Flora of New South Wales
Taxa named by George Bentham